A test match in rugby league football is a representative match between teams representing members of the Rugby League International Federation.

The definition of a test match differs from that of an international match. An international match can be played "between senior/open age or restricted age-level teams from different countries".

Recognition 
Members of the international governing body can make their own recognition of a match as having test status. It is possible for a match to be considered a test by one side but not the other. Matches may also be given test status retrospectively by their governing bodies.

A notable instance of a different in opinions of the status of past matches is a consequence of the Super League war. The Australian Rugby League does not recognise the games played in 1997 by the Australian Super League side against Great Britain and New Zealand. The three sides were representing members of the Super League International Board, the ARL's rival. The five matches, two against New Zealand (the inaugural Anzac Test and an end of season match) and a three test tour of England against Great Britain (Super League Test series) are recognised by the Rugby League International Federation, Rugby Football League and New Zealand Rugby League as tests. There have been calls for the Super League Tests to be included in the ARL's records but ARL Chief Executive Geoff Carr said in 2010, "All historians, and the NRL, agree this is the way it should be treated". ARL historian David Middleton has stated that those players who joined Super League did so in the knowledge that they were forfeiting their chance of representing the established national team.

The first official rugby league international took place on 1 January 1908 when Wales defeated New Zealand 9–8 at the Aberdare Athletic Ground in Aberdare, Wales in front of approximately 15,000 fans. The match was the 29th game of the 1907–08 All Golds tour.

See also

The Ashes (rugby league)
Baskerville Shield
ANZAC Test
Rugby League Four Nations
Rugby League World Cup
Kangaroo Tour

References

Rugby league terminology
Rugby league

de:Test Match